There are three types of elections in Denmark: elections to the national parliament (the Folketing), local elections (to municipal and regional councils), and elections to the European Parliament. Referendums may also be called to consult the Danish citizenry directly on an issue of national concern.

Parliamentary elections are called by the Monarch on the advice of the Prime Minister, usually three to four years after the last election, although early elections may occur. Elections to local councils (municipal or regional) and to the European Parliament are held on fixed dates. Elections use the party-list proportional representation system. All Danish citizens, living in the Kingdom of Denmark and at least 18 years of age, are eligible to vote in parliamentary elections and long-time residents may vote in local elections.

Parliamentary elections

The Kingdom of Denmark (including the Faroe Islands and Greenland) elects a unicameral parliament, the Folketing, on a national level. Of the 179 members of parliament, the Faroe Islands and Greenland elect two members each, 135 are elected from ten multi-member constituencies on a party list PR system using the d'Hondt method and the remaining 40 seats are allocated to ensure proportionality at a national level. 
To get a share of supplementary seats a party needs to get at least 2% of the total number of votes. 

Only parties that reach any one of three thresholds stipulated by section 77 of the Folketing (Parliamentary) Elections Actwinning at least one constituency seat; obtaining at least the Hare quota (valid votes in province/number of constituency seats in province) in two of the three provinces; or obtaining at least 2% of the national votemay compete for compensatory seats.

Denmark has a multi-party system, with numerous parties in which no one party often has a chance of gaining power alone, and parties must work with each other to form coalition governments and/or minority cabinets.

Elections to the Folketing must be held at least every four years.

Latest general election

2019 general election

Local elections

The latest elections for the ninety-eight municipal councils and the five regional councils were held on 16 November 2021.

European elections
The Denmark constituency directly elects thirteen members to the European Parliament every five years. The d'Hondt method of proportional representation is used. The last elections took place in May 2019:

Referendums
The Constitution of Denmark requires a referendum to be held in the following three cases:
 if one third of the members of the Parliament demands a referendum on a law that has been passed in the previous 30 days (excluding some ) (Section 42 of the Constitution), or
 a law that transfers sovereignty to an international organisation has not received a majority of five-sixths of the MPs (Section 20 of the Constitution), or
 in case of changing the electoral age (Section 29 of the Constitution).

The option for one third of the members of the Parliament to put a law to a referendum has a number of restrictions. Finance Bills, Supplementary Appropriation Bills, Provisional Appropriation Bills, Government Loan Bills, Civil Servants (Amendment) Bills, Salaries and Pensions Bills, Naturalization Bills, Expropriation Bills, Taxation (Direct and Indirect) Bills, as well as Bills introduced for the purpose The Work of Parliament of discharging existing treaty obligations shall not be decided by a referendum. (Section 42, Subsection 6 of the Constitution)

Even though the Constitution of Denmark requires referendum to be held only if super-majority of five-sixths of members of Parliament cannot be obtained, in practice, referendums have been held every time new treaties of the European Union have been approved, even when more than five-sixths can be found. Recently, the Danish government was highly criticized when it did not hold a referendum regarding the controversial Lisbon treaty.

In all three cases, to defeat the proposition the no votes must not only outnumber the yes votes, they must also number at least 30% of the electorate.

The Constitution of Denmark can be changed only through the procedure set out in Section 88 of the Constitution. First, the government has to propose a change in constitution, then a parliamentary election is held. After the new parliament approves the same text of the constitutional changes, the proposal is put to a referendum. To pass, the yes votes must not only outnumber the no votes, they must also number at least 40% of the electorate.

Of the 19 referendums held in Denmark, the most recent are the 2015 referendum on ending the opt-out from the European Union justice laws and the 2022 referendum on ending the opt-out from the European Union security and military framework.

Past elections

2015 elections

2011 elections

2007 elections

See also

 Politics of Denmark
 Cabinet of Denmark
 Electoral calendar
 Faroe election results
 Greenland election results

References

External links
 Adam Carr's Election Archive
 Political parties and elections
 NSD: European Election Database - Denmark publishes regional level election data; allows for comparisons of election results, 1990-2007